Helianthemum canariense is a species of flowering plant in the family Cistaceae, native to Western Sahara, Morocco and the Canary Islands.

Description

Taxonomy
The species was first described by Nikolaus von Jacquin in 1781 or 1782, as Cistus canariensis, and transferred to Helianthemum in 1806 by Christiaan Persoon.

Distribution and habitat
Helianthemum canariense is native to the Canary Islands, Western Sahara and Morocco.

References

canariense
Flora of Western Sahara
Flora of Morocco
Flora of the Canary Islands